The Pine Point Formation is a stratigraphical unit of Givetian age in the Western Canadian Sedimentary Basin. 

It takes the name from Pine Point, a promontory (and former townsite) on the south shore of the Great Slave Lake, west of Fort Resolution, and was first described in outcrop on the shore of the lake between Pine Point and Fort Resolution by A.E. Cameron in 1918.

Lithology
The Pine Point Formation is composed of bituminous limestone and calcareous shale.

Distribution

Relationship to other units
The Pine Point Formation is overlain by the Presqu'ile Formation and Sulphur Point Formation; It conformably overlays the Chinchaga Formation and Fitzgerald Formation.

It is equivalent to Muskeg Formation in northern Alberta, the Dunedin Formation in British Columbia and the upper Nahanni Formation in western Northwest Territories.

Subdivisions
The Pine Point has group status in the southern Northwest Territories, and includes:
 Buffalo River Member
 Horn River Formation shale tongues
 Keg River Formation platform facies was included in the group before 1975

References

Stratigraphy of the Northwest Territories
Stratigraphy of British Columbia
Givetian Stage
Devonian southern paleotropical deposits